Austrocochlea is a genus of medium-sized sea snails, marine gastropod molluscs in the family Trochidae, the top snails, also known as top shells.

This genus was founded as a subgenus by Fisher in 1885 to include a small group of Australian species, included in the genus Monodonta. They had previously been included in Trochocochlea Klein, 1753 ( = Osilinus Philippi, 1847), a section that was then restricted to the Mediterranean group.

Distribution
This marine species occurs off the Philippines and mainly off Australia.

Species
Species within the genus Austrocochlea include:
 Austrocochlea brevis Parsons & Ward, 1994
 Austrocochlea constellata (Souverbie, 1863)
 Austrocochlea constricta (Lamarck, 1822), the southern ribbed top snail
 Austrocochlea diminuta (Hedley, 1912)
 Austrocochlea piperina (Philippi, 1849)
 Austrocochlea porcata (A. Adams, 1853), the zebra top snail
 Austrocochlea quadrasi (Sowerby III, 1898)
 Austrocochlea rudis Gray, 1826
 Austrocochlea zeus P. Fischer, 1874
Species brought into synonymy
 Austrocochlea adelaidae (Philippi, 1851): synonym of Chlorodiloma adelaidae (Philippi, 1849)
 Austrocochlea concamerata (Wood, 1828): synonym of Diloma concamerata (Wood, 1828)
 Austrocochlea obtusa Iredale, T. & McMichael, D.F. 1962: synonym of Austrocochlea constricta (Lamarck, 1822)
 Austrocochlea odontis (W. Wood, 1828): synonym of Chlorodiloma odontis (W. Wood, 1828)
 Austrocochlea porcata Iredale, T. & McMichael, D.F. 1962: synonym of Austrocochlea constricta (Lamarck, 1822)
 Austrocochlea torri Cotton & Godfrey, 1934: synonym of Austrocochlea constricta (Lamarck, 1822)
 Austrocochlea tricingulata (Adams, A., 1853): synonym of Austrocochlea quadrasi Sowerby III, 1898
 Austrocochlea zebra Menke, K.T., 1829: synonym of Austrocochlea porcata (A. Adams, 1853)

References

 Risso, 1826 [Risso ex Leach MS]; Histoire naturelle des principales productions de l'Europe méridionale, 4: 134
 Fischer, 1855: Manuel de conchyliologie et de paléontologie conchyliologique, (9): 820; Placed on the Official List by Opinion 1930, 1999, Bulletin of Zoological Nomenclature, 56(3): 202
  Finlay, 1926: Transactions and Proceedings of the New Zealand Institute, 57: 352, 370
Nomenclator Zoologicus info
 Donald K.M., Kennedy M. & Spencer H.G. (2005) The phylogeny and taxonomy of austral monodontine topshells (Mollusca: Gastropoda: Trochidae), inferred from DNA sequences. Molecular Phylogenetics and Evolution 37: 474-483

 
Trochidae
Gastropod genera